The World Series of Golf was a professional golf tournament on the PGA Tour, played at Firestone Country Club in Akron, Ohio. From its inception in 1962 through 1975, it was an unofficial 36-hole event matching the winners of the four major championships. In 1976 it became an official PGA Tour event; the field expanded to 20 players and the event was lengthened to 72 holes. the victory and $100,000 winner's share went to Nicklaus. The field was increased to over 40 players in 1983, though it never exceeded 50; NEC began sponsoring the event in 1984.

The tournament was last played in 1998, but was replaced by the newly created WGC-NEC Invitational in 1999.  Firestone Country Club had hosted that tournament (now known as the WGC-Bridgestone Invitational) every year until 2019, except for 2002.

History
The World Series of Golf was founded as a four-man invitational event in 1962, comprising the winners of the four major championships in a 36-hole event. In the made-for-television tournament, the competitors played in one group for $75,000 in unofficial prize money, televised by NBC.

1962–1975
The inaugural edition in September 1962 included only the "Big Three" of Arnold Palmer, Jack Nicklaus, and Gary Player. Palmer had won two majors that year and a fourth competitor was not added. Palmer shot a course record 65 in the first round on Saturday, but fell back with a 74 on Sunday. Nicklaus won with 135, four strokes ahead of Palmer and Player. Nicklaus, age 22, won a then-staggering $50,000, with $15,000 for second and $5,000 each for third and fourth, split between the other two for $12,500 each. Opposite this competition was the regular tour event in Denver, which had a winner's share of $4,300. The highest paying major at the time was the Masters with a winner's share of $20,000; Nicklaus had won $17,500 at the U.S. Open at Oakmont, which included a sizable $2,500 playoff bonus from the extra day's gate receipts, well-attended due to the presence of favorite son Palmer. At the time of his big Akron payday, the U.S. Open was Nicklaus' only tour victory as a rookie, but he won the next two events at Seattle ($4,300) and Portland ($3,500).

In 1963, Nicklaus won two majors, so a fourth player was added to the World Series via an 18-hole playoff between the three men who had lost playoffs in that year's majors; Palmer and Jacky Cupit in the U.S. Open and Phil Rodgers in the Open Championship. Palmer prevailed by five strokes in the August playoff. Nicklaus repeated as the World Series winner in September, one stroke ahead of Julius Boros, with Palmer in third and Bob Charles in fourth. The opposite tour event in 1963 was the Utah Open in Salt Lake City, with a winner's share of $6,400.

The first year with four players as reigning major champions was 1964, the first without Nicklaus. Tony Lema took the top spot, followed by Ken Venturi, Bobby Nichols, and Palmer. This was also the first year without a concurrent PGA Tour event.

In the final year of the four-man format in 1975, Tom Watson won with a two-stroke advantage over runner-up Nicklaus. The money was the same as in 1962, except that third place received $7,500, claimed by Tom Weiskopf. Nicklaus had won his second major of the year, the PGA Championship, at the same course a month earlier. In the fourteen editions of the event, Nicklaus played in ten, won four, and finished as runner-up in six.

In subsequent years, if one had won multiple majors, the alternate was the winner of the Western Open or Canadian Open.

The format of the four major winners in a 36-hole competition was later adopted by the PGA of America in 1979 for its PGA Grand Slam of Golf, last held in 2014.

From 1961 through 1976, Firestone also hosted the American Golf Classic on the South course. It was not played in the years of the PGA Championship (1960, 1966, 1975), and the final edition in 1976 was played on the par-72 North course, with the World Series on the South course the following week.

1976–1998
In 1976, it became a 72-hole, $300,000 PGA Tour event and its field was initially expanded to twenty; the victory and $100,000 winner's share went to Nicklaus. The largest first prize at a major that year was $45,000 at the PGA Championship.

The World Series of Golf quickly became a leading event on the tour. For many years a victory in it gave a 10-year exemption on the PGA Tour, the same as was granted for a victory in a major championship at that time, and twice as long as is given even for winning a major now. The field consisted of the winners of all the high status men's professional golf tournaments around the world in the previous twelve months.

The field was expanded in 1984 to include some international players, all tour event winners, and the top fifteen on the current money list, with 47 players eligible. The expansion wasn't well-received by all players, and a notable absence was Seve Ballesteros of Spain, who opted out.

Winners

Unofficial four-man event

^ Third place was $5,000 in the first three editions (1962–64)

Notes

References

Former PGA Tour events
Golf in Ohio
Sports in Akron, Ohio
Sports competitions in Ohio
Recurring sporting events established in 1962
Recurring sporting events disestablished in 1998
1962 establishments in Ohio
1998 disestablishments in Ohio